Edward William Thomson (February 12, 1849–1924) was a Canadian journalist and writer. He wrote a book of short stories and a book of poetry.

Life
Thomson was born in Peel County, Ontario, the grandson of Edward William Thomson, a member of the York militia who was a member of the Legislative Assembly of Upper Canada.

When Thompson was 14, he was sent to Philadelphia to work in a mercantile office; he enlisted in the Union Army in October 1864 (at 15), and saw action during the American Civil War as a trooper in the 3rd Pennsylvania Cavalry.

Thomson returned to Canada when discharged in August 1865. He saw combat again the next year, at the Battle of Ridgeway during the Fenian Raids.

Thomson took up civil engineering in 1867, and worked as a Land Surveyor from 1872 to 1878. In 1878, at the invitation of publisher George Brown, he became an editorial writer for The Toronto Globe. In 1891 he joined the staff of The Youth's Companion, and worked there for the next 11 years.

He wrote a book of short stories, Old Man Savarin and Other Stories (1895), and one of poetry, The Many-Mansioned House and Other Poems (1909).

Publications
Old Man Savarin and Other Stories (1895)
When Lincoln Died: And Other Poems (1909)
Red-Headed Windego 
Verbitzsky's Stratagem 
Mc Grath's Bad Night 
Great Godfrey's Lament

References

External links
E.W. Thomson in Canadian Poets – Biography & 5 poems (Thunderchild's Lament, The Mandan Priest, The Canadian Rossignol (In May), The Canadian Rossignol (In June), From 'Peter Ottawa')

Old man Savarin stories: tales of Canada and Canadians at Internet Archive

1849 births
1924 deaths
Canadian male short story writers
19th-century Canadian poets
Canadian male poets
19th-century Canadian short story writers
19th-century Canadian male writers